The Portland Webfeet were  a Minor League Baseball team in the Pacific Northwest League. They were located in Portland, Oregon and played at Columbia Park.

In  the Webfeet won the league championship, even playing teams from the California League, including Sacramento, San Francisco and San Jose. The Pacific Northwest League folded in the second half of the 1892 season due to the onset of a nationwide economic depression known as the Panic of 1893.

Year-by-year record

Notable players
Kid Baldwin
Tom Dolan
Willard Mains
Jake Stenzel
George Tebeau
Bill White
Jiggs Parrott - First MLB player from Oregon.

See also
History of baseball in Portland, Oregon

Defunct minor league baseball teams
Professional baseball teams in Oregon
Defunct baseball teams in Oregon
Portland Webfeet players
1890 establishments in Oregon
1892 disestablishments in Oregon
Webfeet
Baseball teams established in 1890
Sports clubs disestablished in 1892
Baseball in Portland, Oregon
Baseball teams disestablished in 1892